The Kang Ding-class frigate is based on the French  design which were built by DCNS for Taiwan.

Background and design 
As the ROC (Taiwan)'s defensive stance is aimed towards the Taiwan Strait, the ROC Navy is constantly seeking to upgrade its anti-submarine warfare capabilities. The US$1.75 billion agreement with France in the early 1990s was an example of this procurement strategy: the six ships are configured for both anti-submarine warfare (ASW) and surface attack. The Exocet was replaced by Taiwan-developed Hsiung Feng II anti-ship missile and the anti-air warfare (AAW) weapon is the Sea Chaparral. The main gun is an Oto Melara 76 mm/62 mk 75 gun, similar to its Singaporean counterparts, the s. Some problems in the integration of Taiwanese and French systems had been reported. The frigate carries a single Sikorsky S-70C(M)-1/2 ASW helicopter.

The Sea Chaparral SAM system is considered inadequate for defense against aircraft and anti-ship missiles, so the ROC (Taiwan) Navy plans to upgrade its air-defense capabilities with the indigenous TC-2N in 2020. The AMRAAM-class missiles will be quad-packed in a vertical launch system for future ROCN surface combatants, but a less-risky alternative arrangement of above-deck, fixed oblique launchers is seen as more likely for upgrading these French-built frigates.

In 2021 it was reported that Taiwan would upgrade the frigates of this class with new air defence and combat systems. The upgrades were to begin in 2022 and would follow on the modernization of the ships' decoy launching systems under a contract awarded in 2020.

The class's Mk 75 main guns have been upgraded and have an improved firing rate of 100 rounds a minute.

Ships in class

Taiwan frigate scandal

The Taiwan frigate deal was a huge political scandal, both in Taiwan and France. Eight people involved in the contract died in unusual and possibly suspicious circumstances. Arms dealer Andrew Wang fled Taiwan to the UK after the body of presumptive whistleblower Captain Yin Ching-feng was found floating in the sea. In 2001 Swiss authorities froze accounts held by Andrew Wang and family in connection to the Taiwan frigate scandal.

In 2003, the Taiwanese Navy sued Thomson-CSF (Thales) to recover alleged $590 million in kickbacks, paid to French and Taiwanese officials to grease the 1991 La Fayette deal. The kickback money was deposited in Swiss banks, and under the corruption investigation, Swiss authorities froze approx. $730 million in over 60 accounts. In June 2007 the Swiss authority returned $34 million from frozen accounts to Taiwan, with additional funds pending. 

Andrew Wang died in the UK in 2015 and collection efforts continued against his family. In February 2021, the Federal Department of Justice and Police said that Switzerland will restitute nearly US$266 million to Taiwan.

References 
 

Frigate classes
 
Stealth ships
Frigates of the Republic of China Navy